The Djerimanga, also known as the Wulna, are an indigenous Australian people of the Northern Territory.

Country
Humpty Doo Station, Koolpinyah Station and Djukbinj National Park are also situated within these traditional boundaries. Historically, the Djerimanga had a southern inland extension of their land as far as the Margaret River and the Ringwood Range, but lost it to the eastern Djowei.

Alternative names
 Djeramanga, Jermangel
 Waak
 Wulna, Woolna (toponym), Woolnah, Woolner, Wulnar, Wolna

Source:

Language 
Wulna (Wuna) is an extinct indigenous language, formerly of the Djerimanga and Beriguruk people.

Notes

Citations

Sources

Aboriginal peoples of the Northern Territory